Football Club de Cournon-d'Auvergne is a French association football club founded in 1919. They are based in the town of Cournon-d'Auvergne and their home stadium is the Stade Joseph Gardet, which has a capacity of 437 spectators. As of the 2017–18 season, they play in the Regional 1 Auvergne-Rhône-Alpes.

External links
FC Cournon-d'Auvergne official website 

Cournon
1919 establishments in France
Sport in Puy-de-Dôme
Football clubs in Auvergne-Rhône-Alpes